The Walter Scolar was a Czechoslovakian nine-cylinder, air-cooled radial engine for powering light aircraft that first ran in 1936. With a displacement of 8 litres (490 cu in), it produced 132 kW (180 hp) at 2,500 rpm.

Applications
Beneš-Mráz Beta-Scolar

Engines on display
Preserved examples of the Walter Skolar engine are on display at the following museums:
Muzeum Letectva, Košice
Prague Aviation Museum, Kbely

Specifications (Scolar)

See also

References

Notes

Bibliography

 Gunston, Bill. World Encyclopedia of Aero Engines. Cambridge, England. Patrick Stephens Limited, 1989. 

1930s aircraft piston engines
Scolar
Aircraft air-cooled radial piston engines